Sini (from ,) is a calligraphic style used in China for the Arabic script. It can refer to any type of Chinese Arabic calligraphy, but is commonly used to refer to one with thick and tapered effects such as seen in Chinese calligraphy. It is used extensively in mosques in Eastern China and to a lesser extent in Gansu, Ningxia and Shaanxi.

Two famous Sini calligraphers are Muhammad Hasan ibn Yusuf (Shi Jie Cheng 1927-2006) and Hajji Noor Deen Mi Guangjiang (b. 1963).

Gallery

See also
Islamic calligraphy
Chinese calligraphy
Xiao'erjing: the use of Arabic script for writing Chinese language

External links 
Islamic Calligraphy in China, China Heritage Newsletter, Number 5 (March 2006)
Hajji Noor Deen's Website, features Sini galleries
Islamic Chinese Art (Dru C. Gladney's photo album on Flickr.com)

Arabic calligraphy
Chinese calligraphy
Islamic calligraphy
Islam in China